Elsie Marie Knott ( Taylor; September 20, 1922December 3, 1995) was the first woman in Canada to be elected as Chief of a First Nation. Knott became Chief of the Curve Lake First Nation in 1954, three years after the Indian Act was amended to give First Nations women the right to vote and hold positions in band governments.

Career
At the age of 33, Elsie Knott became Chief of the Curve Lake First Nation, known at the time as the Mississaugas of Mud Lake, which is a Mississauga Ojibway First Nation near Peterborough, Ontario. Elections of other female First Nation chiefs and councilors followed across Canada. By 1960, 21 women held elected band council positions, but elected First Nation female leadership was not widely embraced until the late 1990s–early 2000s. Knott herself went on to win eight consecutive elections and served as chief for sixteen years.

She was known for her work relating to preserving the Ojibwe language, which included founding a language program at the Curve Lake First Nation School. As an elder, Knott also helped revive the community's powwow celebrations. At the time of her death, Curve Lake First Nation Chief Keith Knott (not a direct relation) gave Knott's role in developing the reserve's school bus service as a prime example of her leadership and dedication to the community,

She later arranged, through the Indian Affairs Department, the purchase of two conventional school buses, which she drove for 25 years.

Awards
 Outstanding Women Award (1992)
 Her memory was honoured as part of the Anishinabek Nation's Celebration of Women Conference (1998)
 Life Achievement award, Union of Ontario Indians (1999)

References

1922 births
1995 deaths
Indigenous leaders in Ontario
Ojibwe people